Thana Bulla Khan or Thano Bula Khan (Sindhi: ٿاڻو بولا خان ) is a town and Taluka headquarter in Jamshoro District, Sindh, Pakistan. As of the 2017 census, Thana Bula Khan Taluka has a population of  145,450. The total area of the Taluka is 5367 km2. The population density is 27.10/km2.

References

External links 
The Tombs of Burfat Tribe at Taung, Thana Bula Khan, Sindh (Pakistan)

Thano bula Khan town chairman Haresh Dinani MPA from their giyan chand

Populated places in Jamshoro District
Talukas of Sindh